is a Japanese manga series written and illustrated by Minya Hiraga. It was serialized in Shueisha's Weekly Shōnen Jump magazine from July to November 2021, with its chapters collected into three tankōbon volumes as of February 2022.

Plot 
Neruma Isami is a young man who is passionate about martial arts. Unsure of what he wants to do in life aside from train in martial arts, he meets Akebi Haiba, who takes him to Amato High School, an academy which is made up of students who study martial arts.

Characters 
Neruma Isami 
A practicing martial artist, who was raised solely by his grandfather. He is nicknamed Neru by his classmates.
Akebi Haiba
A martial artist who takes an interest in Neru.
Toriichi Hartori
A practicing martial artist. Though not physically gifted, he is very academic.

Publication 
The series is written and illustrated by Minya Hiraga. It was serialized on the Weekly Shōnen Jump website in September 2020, before beginning full serialization in the main Weekly Shōnen Jump magazine on July 5, 2021. It ended serialization on November 15, 2021. Shueisha has collected its chapters into individual tankōbon volumes. The first volume was released on November 4, 2021. As of February 4, 2022, three volumes have been released.

Viz Media and Manga Plus are publishing chapters of the series simultaneously with the Japanese release.

Volume list

Chapters not yet in tankōbon format 
These chapters have yet to be published in a tankōbon volume.

Reception 
Steven Blackburn from Screen Rant criticized the series due to its similarities to Naruto. Contrary to Blackburn, Jacob Parker-Dalton from Otaquest offered the first chapter praise for it setting up the plot well.

Notes

References

External links 
  
 
 
 

Martial arts anime and manga
Shōnen manga
Shueisha manga
Viz Media manga